The Jewish Journal could refer to a number of publications:
The Jewish Journal (Boston North), newspaper serving the Jewish community of Essex County, Massachusetts north of Boston
The Jewish Journal of Greater Los Angeles
Jewish Morning Journal, a Yiddish-language publication in New York from 1901 to 1971
San Diego Jewish Journal